Taenionema is a genus of winter stoneflies in the family Taeniopterygidae. There are about 14 described species in Taenionema.

Species
These 14 species belong to the genus Taenionema:

 Taenionema atlanticum Ricker & Ross, 1975 (Atlantic willowfly)
 Taenionema californicum (Needham & Claassen, 1925) (California willowfly)
 Taenionema grinnelli (Banks, 1918)
 Taenionema jacobii Stanger & Baumann, 1993
 Taenionema japonicum (Matsumura, 1904)
 Taenionema jeanae Baumann & Nelson, 2007
 Taenionema jewetti Stanger & Baumann, 1993
 Taenionema kincaidi (Hoppe, 1938)
 Taenionema oregonense (Needham & Claassen, 1925) (oregon willowfly)
 Taenionema pacificum (Banks, 1900)
 Taenionema pallidum (Banks, 1902)
 Taenionema raynorium (Claassen, 1937)
 Taenionema uinta Stanger & Baumann, 1993
 Taenionema umatilla Stanger & Baumann, 1993

References

Further reading

External links

 

Taeniopterygidae
Articles created by Qbugbot